α-Chlorocodide is an opioid analog that is a derivative of codeine in which the 6-hydroxy group has been replaced by chlorine.

See also
 Chloromorphide

References

Opioids
Organochlorides
4,5-Epoxymorphinans
Nitrogen heterocycles
Oxygen heterocycles
Methoxy compounds